Livestock Exchange Building is a historic commercial building located at St. Joseph, Missouri.  It was designed by architect Edmond Jacques Eckel (1845–1934) and built in 1898–1899.  It is a four-story, red brick and stone building with Neoclassical style ornamentation.  Also on the property are two contributing multi-car garages and a loading platform.  The building was once considered the crown jewel in the vast stockyards and packinghouses on the south side of St. Joseph.

It was listed on the National Register of Historic Places in 2004.

References

Commercial buildings on the National Register of Historic Places in Missouri
Neoclassical architecture in Missouri
Commercial buildings completed in 1899
Buildings and structures in St. Joseph, Missouri
National Register of Historic Places in Buchanan County, Missouri